Mogok Township is a township of Thabeikkyin District in Mandalay Region, Burma (Myanmar). It is located north of the city of Mandalay and surrounds the town of Mogok.

Demographics

2014

The 2014 Myanmar Census reported that Kutkai Township had a population of 167,149. The population density was 142.3 people per km². The census reported that the median age was 26.7 years, and 103 males per 100 females. There were 35,247 households; the mean household size was 4.5.

References

External links
 "Pyin Oo Lwin / Mogoke Map" Myanmar Information Management Unit (MIMU)
 "Mogok Google Satellite Map" Maplandia

 
Townships of Mandalay Region